Christopher Robert Richard (born June 7, 1974) is a former American Major League Baseball outfielder and first baseman. He is an alumnus of University of San Diego High School in San Diego and of Oklahoma State University.

Career
Drafted by the St. Louis Cardinals in the 19th round of the 1995 MLB Draft, Richard made his Major League Baseball debut with the Cardinals on July 17, . He hit a home run in his first major league at-bat, becoming the fourth player in the history of the club to do so. After appearing in six games with the Cardinals, Richard was traded to the Baltimore Orioles on July 29, 2000, for pitcher Mike Timlin.

With Baltimore, Richard's  campaign would be the best of his career. In 136 games for the Orioles, he compiled a .265 batting average with 15 home runs and 65 RBI.

Initially a first baseman, Richard was converted to an outfielder with Jeff Conine being the Orioles' mainstay at first base, and later Todd Helton being the Rockies starter at first.

Richard returned to Durham to start the  season.  He was called up by the Rays on September 7, 2009, after Carlos Peña suffered two broken fingers on a CC Sabathia pitch, and had one plate appearance in the second game of a day/night doubleheader against the New York Yankees.

Richard was released and became a minor league free agent in 2009.

He played for the Durham Bulls once again in 2010.

Richard retired on March 4, 2011.

Richard lives in his hometown of San Diego, CA with his wife and daughter, where he co-owns and operates his family business, Personal Pitcher.

References

External links

1974 births
Living people
Aberdeen IronBirds players
Arkansas Travelers players
Baltimore Orioles players
Bowie Baysox players
Colorado Rockies players
Durham Bulls players
Gulf Coast Orioles players
Indianapolis Indians players
Major League Baseball first basemen
Major League Baseball outfielders
Baseball players from San Diego
Memphis Redbirds players
New Jersey Cardinals players
Oklahoma RedHawks players
Oklahoma State Cowboys baseball players
Rochester Red Wings players
St. Louis Cardinals players
St. Petersburg Cardinals players
Tampa Bay Rays players